Andrea Lindholz (born 25 September 1970) is a German lawyer and politician of the Christian Social Union (CSU) who has been serving as a member of the Bundestag from the state of Bavaria since 2013. She represents the Aschaffenburg constituency.

Early career 
Born in Bonn, North Rhine-Westphalia, Lindholz studied law at the Goethe University Frankfurt and the University of Würzburg. Since 2000, she has been practicing as a lawyer specialized on family law in Aschaffenburg.

Political career 
Lindholz first became a member of the Bundestag in the 2013 German federal election. She is a member of the Committee for Home Affairs. Since 2018, she has also been a member of the Committee for the Scrutiny of Acoustic Surveillance of the Private Home and the Parliamentary Oversight Panel (PKGr), which provides parliamentary oversight of Germany’s intelligence services BND, BfV and MAD. 

In the negotiations to form a fourth coalition government under the leadership of Chancellor Angela Merkel following the 2017 federal elections, Lindholz was part of the working group on internal and legal affairs, led by Thomas de Maizière, Stephan Mayer and Heiko Maas.

Since 2021, Lindholz has been serving as one her parliamentary group's deputy chairs, under the leadership of chair Ralph Brinkhaus. In this capacity, she oversees the group’s legislative activities on internal and legal affairs.

Other activities 
 Memorial to the Murdered Jews of Europe Foundation, Member of the Board of Trustees
 Technisches Hilfswerk (Federal Agency for Technical Relief), Vice President of the Federal Association
 Foundation "Remembrance, Responsibility and Future“ (EVZ), Deputy Member of the Board of Trustees
 Federal Foundation for the Reappraisal of the SED Dictatorship, Deputy Member of the Board of Trustees
 St Barbara Foundation, Member of the Board of Trustees

Political positions
In June 2017, Lindholz voted against Germany's introduction of same-sex marriage.

References

External links 
 
 Bundestag biography 

1970 births
Living people
Members of the Bundestag for Bavaria
Female members of the Bundestag
21st-century German women politicians
Members of the Bundestag 2021–2025
Members of the Bundestag 2017–2021
Members of the Bundestag 2013–2017
Politicians from Bonn
Members of the Bundestag for the Christian Social Union in Bavaria